Feel Good is the second studio album by Australian recording artist Che'Nelle. It was first released on 10 February 2010 by EMI Music Japan. It is a follow-up to her internationally released debut album "Things Happen for a Reason" (2007). The singer's manager Sir Charles Dixon served as the album's executive producer. "Feel Good" contains songs which were written by Che'Nelle herself and features production from Jason Gill, Toshinobu Kubota and The Insomniax. The album features collaborations with Jamaican artist Shaggy, the American signer Colby O'Donis and Japanese act Lecca. Two songs originally featured on her debut made it onto the album. It received a physical CD release solely in Japan and charted at number forty-one on the Japan Oricon album chart.

Background and promotion
Che'Nelle received a writing credit on eleven of the fifteen tracks featured on the "Feel Good". American signer Colby O'Donis features on the song "Razor". He also wrote and produced the song. Shaggy collaborated with her for the track "Running A Muck" and was produced by Tony "CD" Kelly. The song "First Love" from her special edition release of her debut album was included on the album. It also contains a remixed version featuring Japanese singer Lecca. Che'Nelle worked with production duo The Insomniax on a number of songs featured on the album. The album was exclusively produced by Sir Charles Dixon and Che'Nelle herself served as the project's associate producer. Chris Wami was in charge of the "Feel Good's" promotion work. The final mastering for the album was done by Tom Coyne at Sterling Sound in New York City. The final three songs on the tracklist were marketed as bonus tracks.

The album's release was announced in January 2018. The album entered the Japan Oricon album chart at number forty-one, on the week ending 14 February 2010. This remained its highest position and spent a total of nine weeks in the chart.

The first single from the album is its title track "Feel Good". It was written by Che'Nelle, Jason Gill and The Insomniax, then produced by the latter. The song's lyrics features her often used opening shout-out of "Che'Nelle got a story for ya". A promotional CD for the song was released via EMI music Japan. A music video for "Feel Good" was released in early 2010.

"Missing" was marketed as the album's second single. A music video was later released to promote the song. The song was later included on Che'Nelle's third studio album Luv Songs.

Track listing
Japanese Edition

Personnel
Credits adapted from the liner notes of Feel Good.

Lionel Anthony - writer
Orville Burrell - vocals, writer
Kirsten Ashley Cole - writer
Cham - vocals
Che'Nelle - associate producer, lead vocals
Tom Coyne - mixing
Charles Dixon - executive producer
Matt Friedman - writer, producer, mixing
Emile Ghantous - writer, producer, mixing
Tia L Gilford - legal
Jason Gill - writer, producer, mixing
Dominic Glover - trumpet
Jay Glover - mixing
Jam & Yuki  - hair and make-up
Yuji Kamijo - mixing
Anthony Kelly - writer, producer
R. Kelly - writer
Asuka Kito - styling
Toshinobu Kubota - writer
Joe Lamont - writer
Lecca - vocals, writer
Latesha Morrow - writer
Takeshi Nakagawa - mixing
Erik Nelson - writer, producer, mixing, guitar and bass
Colby O'Donis - vocals, writer, producer, mixing
Bryan O'Neil - writer
Gregg Pagani - writer, producer, mixing
Chris Robinson - writer, producer, mixing
Leroy Romans - writer
Frederik Nordsø Schjoldan - writer, producer
Fridolin Nordsø Schjoldan - writer, producer
Kazuaki Seki - photography
Eddie Edwin Serrano - writer
Brian Stanley - writer, mixing
Chris Wami - promotion

Chart positions

Release history

References

2010 albums
Che'Nelle albums